Gregory Andrew Germann (born February 26, 1958) is an American actor who is known for playing Richard Fish on the television series Ally McBeal, which earned him a Screen Actors Guild award. He also is known for his roles as Eric "Rico" Morrow on the sitcom Ned & Stacey, Tom Koracick in Grey’s Anatomy and as Hades in Season Five of Once Upon a Time.

Early life
Germann was born in Houston. The family moved to the Lookout Mountain outside of Golden, Colorado. His mother, Marlene Marian (née Faulkner), was a homemaker and his father, Edward A. Germann, was a playwright and professor. While living in Colorado, Germann expressed interest in acting. He starred in stage plays during his middle and high-school years, before moving to New York in 1982.

Career

Early work
He started in several Broadway plays while in New York, including a role in 1982 alongside Matthew Broderick in the play Fancy This, which Germann also co-wrote. He received praise for roles in the 1982 musical Chicago, and the 1983 musical The Wizard of Oz. He continued to have roles in plays before seeing a poster for wanted actors for a film in 1985. He moved to Hollywood to find film success, and got his first role in the teen comedy film, The Whoopee Boys in 1986. The supporting role in that film helped Greg's career, so he could star in bigger and mainstream films. His next film was 1990's Child's Play 2, in which he played the character Mattson, in the well-received sequel to one of the most popular horror films of all time.  Child's Play 2, and the 1991 romantic comedy Once Around, helped the actor gain mainstream success. In 1990, Germann originated the role of John Hinckley Jr. in Stephen Sondheim's Assassins.

1990s success and Ally McBeal
After Child's Play 2 and Once Around were released, he gained fame as a character named Petey in the 1994 critical and commercial success Clear and Present Danger, and landed a supporting role as Rico on the sitcom Ned & Stacey, which lasted from 1995 to 1997.

In 1997, after Ned & Stacey, Germann was offered the role as Richard Fish on the legal - comedy series Ally McBeal which he played for five seasons, from 1997 to 2002. During this time, he received three nominations for the Screen Actors Guild awards, winning one. Germann directed a few Ally McBeal episodes, including "Fear of Flirting" (season 5, episode 4). He appeared on ABC's In Case of Emergency as Sherman Yablonsky until it was canceled after one season, and was also in the pilot episode of Eureka. He did not reprise the role, and his character's disappearance was explained in the official comic book as having been reassigned to Alaska.

2000s work
After Ally McBeal ended Germann starring in several films, including Down to Earth, Sweet November, and Joe Somebody, all being released in 2001. He guest-appeared twice on The Bernie Mac Show.

He got lead roles in 2005 in the family comedies Family Plan and Down and Derby.

In 2006, he guest-starred in the series, Desperate Housewives

In 2009, he starred in the Nickelodeon made-for-television musical film Spectacular!. He portrayed the role of Mr. Virgil Romano.

2010s work
In 2010, he played Jerry Erickson in the holiday film The Santa Incident.

Germann has appeared in NCIS since the season-10 episode "Shiva", playing NCIS Assistant Director Jerome Craig. Later, in the episode "Canary", he briefly took over the agency while the director at the time (Leon Vance) was on temporary leave following a family tragedy.

Germann has appeared infrequently in Law & Order: Special Victims Unit playing ADA Derek Strauss.

In 2016, Germann appeared in the ABC fantasy series drama Once Upon A Time portraying Hades, the God of the Underworld, for ten episodes. He was in the film Foster Boy.

He also appeared as neurosurgeon Tom Koracick, in Grey's Anatomy.

Filmography

Films

Television

Theatre

References

External links
 

1958 births
Living people
American male film actors
American male television actors
American male voice actors
Male actors from Houston
20th-century American male actors
21st-century American male actors
Male actors from Colorado
People from Golden, Colorado